Bang is a collaborative extended play (EP) by English singer and songwriter Rita Ora and Kazakh disc jockey Imanbek. The record was released for digital download and streaming in various countries by Atlantic and Warner on 12 February 2021. Created amidst the pandemic of COVID-19, it discovers various genres of club, dance, house and pop with 1980s and 1990s influences. The record was promoted with the release of a single, "Big", and a film shot in Bulgaria as a tribute to Ora's Albanian and Imanbek's Kazakh heritages. Following its release, it was met with a warm reception from music critics for the collaboration between the artists, its mainstream appeal and production. Commercially, the record reached number 16 on the US Billboard Top Dance/Electronic Albums ranking.

Background and composition 

On 4 February 2021, Ora and Imanbek announced the forthcoming release of their collaborative extended play entitled Bang. The artists confirmed its release date and track listing through a image uploaded on their social media that showcased the involved collaborators. The record was created remotely using the American software Zoom amidst the pandemic of COVID-19, with the aim of establishing creative connections with artists from around the world. Despite jointly writing all four songs, it took Ora and Imanbek eight months to complete the creation process of the record. Ora stated that "it's amazing how much technology allowed our connection to shine through [...] and this EP is proof that creative process has the power to transcend any obstacle that separates us". Imanbek further elaborated on the process that "[It] brought us together not only creatively but personally and that was a great experience". Atlantic, Warner and What a DJ ultimately released the record for digital download and streaming in various countries on the scheduled date of 12 February 2021.

With a running time of 11 minutes and 24 seconds, Bang discovers various genres of club, dance, house and pop with the incorporation of sounds from the 1980s and 1990s. For the record, Ora and Imanbek collaborated with several composers, including Alexander Eskeerdo Izquierdo, Gia Koka, Mike Hawkins, Sam Martin, Toby Green and William Spencer Bastian. It opens with "Big" featuring American rapper Gunna, which was created by Ora and Imanbek in partnership with English singer Ed Sheeran and French disc jockey David Guetta. Classified as a dance, EDM, electro-pop, hip hop and house song, it commemorates the moment of having a good time and memories of crazy nights. The record progresses with the second song "Bang Bang", which samples German producer Harold Faltermeyer's single "Axel F" (1985). Designated as an EDM song with a club energy and house notes, the song explores a dangerous and seductive love, that brings trouble. A billingual song, "Mood" is the third song on the record and features Argentine rapper Khea. The song combines elements of dance and hip hop with a rhythmic and upbeat funky instrumental. The record ends with the fourth song "The One", which comprises house, pop and trap music accompanied with dance basslines and dark influences.

Reception and promotion 

Following its release, Bang was met with a warm reception from music critics. Designating it as a "star-studded EP", Farrell Sweeney from Dancing Astronaut acknowledged that each song on the record boasts its "own unique capacity for mainstream appeal" and distinguished "Big" as its "radio favorite". Similarly, Ryan Ford for We Rave You described the record as a "club-ready EP" possessing "four deliciously unique singles". He further emphasised "The One" as a positive conclusion to what he labeled as a "superb EP", also highlighting Ora's "vocal talents" and the duo's "impressive" mainstream appeal. For his website, Thomas Bleach remarked the songs' reliance on "big beat drops and intricate production" and applauded Ora's involvement in producing a "fun collection of tracks". Selene Moral of Los 40 commented that "we find pop sounds [in the EP] that take us to the club culture of the [80s and 90s] and a flavor of house music". Commercially, Bang reached number 16 on the US Billboard Top Dance/Electronic Albums ranking in the issue dated 27 February 2021.

To accompany the release, a four-minute and 50-second lasting film for Bang premiered to Ora's official YouTube channel on 12 February 2021, incorporating a snippet from each song as an introduction to the record. On the same occasion, "Big" and its accompanying music video were released as the record's lead single. Directed by Jasmine Loignon, the scenes were filmed at the mount of Buzludzha and the cities of Pernik and Sofia in Bulgaria. The visuals pay tribute to Ora's Albanian and Imanbek's Kazakh heritages. In it, the singer wears a traditional Albanian attire created by Kosovo-Albanian designer Valdrin Sahiti, which was aimed to display the Albanian ethnographic style, as intended by her. For further promotion, Ora performed "Bang Bang" for the first time in the eighth season of the American talk show the Tonight Show Starring Jimmy Fallon on 3 March 2021. A day later, the singer went on to perform the song on Australian breakfast show Sunrise.

Track listing 

Credits and tracklist adapted from Tidal.

Charts

Release history

References 

2021 EPs
Rita Ora albums
Albums produced by David Guetta
Atlantic Records EPs
Warner Music Group EPs
Dance music EPs
Electronic dance music EPs
House music EPs
Pop music EPs